Austrostipa scabra known as speargrass, is a widespread species of grass found in southern and central Australia, in moist and dry areas.This bunchgrass may reach   tall. There are two sub species, scabra and falcata.

References

External links

scabra
Bunchgrasses of Australasia
Flora of New South Wales
Flora of Queensland
Flora of Victoria (Australia)
Flora of South Australia
Flora of the Northern Territory
Flora of Western Australia
Flora of Tasmania